Mammad Isgandarov (1914–1985) was the chairman of the Council of Ministers of the Azerbaijan Soviet Socialist Republic from 10 July 1959 to 29 December 1961. He was a member of the Communist Party.

See also
Prime Minister of Azerbaijan

References 

Azerbaijani politicians
Azerbaijan State Oil and Industry University alumni
Fourth convocation members of the Supreme Soviet of the Soviet Union
Fifth convocation members of the Supreme Soviet of the Soviet Union
Sixth convocation members of the Supreme Soviet of the Soviet Union
Seventh convocation members of the Supreme Soviet of the Soviet Union
Recipients of the Order of Lenin
1914 births
1985 deaths
Heads of the government of the Azerbaijan Soviet Socialist Republic
Members of the Supreme Soviet of the Azerbaijan Soviet Socialist Republic